Tina Guo (born 28 October 1985) is a Chinese-born American cellist and erhuist from San Diego. Her international career as a cellist, electric cellist, erhuist, and composer is characterized by videos featuring theatrical backdrops and elaborate costumes, a range of genres, and an improvisatory style in film, television, and video game scores.

She has appeared as a soloist with the San Diego Symphony the National Symphony Orchestra (Mexico), the Thessaloniki State Symphony Orchestra in Greece, the Petrobras Symphony in Brazil, and the Vancouver Island Symphony in British Columbia. She also performed with violinist Midori Goto in Dvorak's American String Quartet at Walt Disney Concert Hall in Los Angeles, and completed four national tours of Mexico and Italy performing the Shostakovich, Dvorak, Haydn, and Saint-Saëns Cello Concertos. She toured as a featured guest with Al Di Meola, Yoshiki of X Japan, and recently appeared with the Tenerife Symphony and Choir in the Canary Islands performing "Batman: The Dark Knight" Suite at the Tenerife International Film Festival, featured on Electric Cello. In June 2015, she performed as a guest soloist at the 2015 Kraków Film Festival in Poland. In February 2019, she toured with the Victoria Symphony.
On August 1, 2019, she joined the German symphonic metal band Beyond the Black at Wacken Open Air Festival. She also performed with Swedish power metal band Sabaton on their headlining of the festival and recorded with them in 2021 the song “Steel Commanders”.

Early life
Tina Guo was born in Shanghai, China to father Lu-Yan Guo, a concert cellist, and mother Fei-Fei Soong, a concert violinist, who are the current artistic directors of the California International Music and Art Festival, an annual event held in San Diego, California. Tina began playing piano at the age of 3 in China. At age five, she moved to the United States with her family, she began violin lessons with her mother. At age 7, she began also studying the cello with her father. Her parents forced her to practice 6–8 hours a day. Tina joined the Civic Youth Orchestra when she was 10.

After graduating from Poway High School, she attended the USC Thornton School of Music to study the cello on a full scholarship. She studied under Nathaniel Rosen and also Eleonore Schoenfeld, one of the most influential cellists of the 20th century, who had taught both Rosen and Guo's father. During her freshman year, Guo dated a guitarist with an 80s style classic metal band. She went to one of their shows at The Whiskey in Hollywood, and it influenced her to try to adapt the cello to the heavy metal style. Guo began experimenting with pedals and different techniques, trying to discover how to play the cello to sound like a guitar. It took her three years and many YouTube videos before she was satisfied with her attempts.

Guo left USC in her junior year, as she found it increasingly difficult to balance performing and attending classes. Her parents were very angry and did not agree with her decision.

Career
In 2007, she toured Australia with Metaphor, an all-girl crossover band. Guo played with the Foo Fighters at the 2008 Grammy Awards, and with Off the Deep End she played at the wrap party for the Sundance Film Festival.

With Midori Gotō, she played in Antonín Dvořák's String Quartet No. 12 at Walt Disney Concert Hall in Los Angeles. With pianist William Joseph, she performed in Mallorca, Spain for the International Philanthropy Summit.

From 2011-2013, Guo toured as the featured electric cellist with Cirque du Soleil's Michael Jackson: The Immortal World Tour.

Guo performed alongside Johnny Marr of the Smiths and Hans Zimmer at the Premiere of Inception, and in a sold-out concert for DreamWorks with Hans Zimmer and John Powell, featuring her as soloist on electric cello and erhu.  She recently performed for the League of Legends World Championship to a sold-out arena at Staples Center in Los Angeles and an audience of 33 million streaming online. Guo was featured on the Electric Cello in a super-band for the event with The Crystal Method, Wes Borland (Limp Bizkit), Danny Lohner (NIN), Joe Letz (Combichrist), and the Hollywood Scoring Orchestra.  Guo has also been a featured performer at Comic Con, BlizzCon, and with Video Games Live. In 2015, Guo will be featured with Video Game Music Band Critical Hit, performing at most of the Wizard World Comic Cons. She featured in Baroque rock group Vivaldianno's "City of Mirrors" Tour which appeared in arenas throughout Europe in June 2015.

Guo was featured on The Ellen DeGeneres Show playing "Beat It" on electric cello, and also performed at the American Country Music Awards with Carrie Underwood, on Dancing with the Stars with Carlos Santana and India Arie, Jimmy Kimmel Live with Ellie Goulding, the Lopez Show with Far East Movement, the Grammy Awards with the Foo Fighters, at the MTV Movie Awards, on American Idol, at Comic Con in San Diego featured on the electric cello in the Battlestar Galactica Orchestra, and with Brazilian guitarist Victor Biglione in a Jimi Hendrix Tribute Concert at the Copacabana Palace in Rio de Janeiro. She also performed at the Sundance Film Festival, the Playboy Mansion, and has shared the stage with The Tenors, Stevie Wonder, Peter Gabriel, Josh Groban, John Legend, LeAnn Rimes, Chris Isaak, Il Divo, Ariana Grande, Lupe Fiasco, Common, Jennifer Hudson, and Michael McDonald. Corporate clients have included Microsoft, Cephalon Biopharmaceutics, Adecco and the PGA.

The instrumental metal music video for her song "Queen Bee" won Best Short Film/Music Video at the Downtown Los Angeles Film Festival. Her songs "Queen Bee" and "Forbidden City" are also available for download to play for Rock Band on Xbox 360 and PlayStation 3. Metal Hammer Magazine UK described Guo as "an international sensation"  and she was also featured in Glamour Magazine Russia with a two-page spread.

Guo has toured with blues guitarist Joe Bonamassa as part of a diverse all acoustic backup band, and Hans Zimmer.

By October 2017, she toured as a headlining act to promote her album "Game On!" with John Huldt on guitar, Kfir Melamed on bass and Frank Klepacki on drums.

In December 2018, she took on the God of War main theme song and collaborated with Inon Zur.

Guo is one of the ambassadors to Music Traveler, together with Billy Joel, Hans Zimmer, John Malkovich, Sean Lennon, Adrien Brody.

Recordings
Guo recorded her first solo CD, Autumn Winds, a classical/new-age album.  Her other album releases include The Journey, Eternity, Ray of Light, Tina Guo & Composers for Charity, A Cello Christmas, Cello Metal, a full length metal album and Hollywood's Greatest Themes, an album of famous soundtracks re-imagined, Game On! and her recent album was Dies Irae.

Guo is featured on screen in commercials for Mazda6, and United Airlines, and was also a featured soloist in Cirque Du Soleil's Michael Jackson: The Immortal World Tour from 2011 to 2013 performing in sold-out arenas around the world. Guo performed to 2 million audience members worldwide with the tour, and they topped the charts for 2 years as the highest-grossing tour in America and sold-out shows in arenas worldwide. Guo is also featured on the Epic Records/Jackson Estate release "Immortal," replacing the original guitar solo in "Beat It" with an Electric Cello/Guitar Battle-style duet with guitarist Greg Howe.

Guo was the cello soloist on the scores of Sherlock Holmes, Iron Man 2, Clash of the Titans, Red Riding Hood, Abduction, Olympus Has Fallen, Escape Plan, CSI: NY, Vikings, The Borgias, Sleepy Hollow, Iron Chef America, Blizzard's Diablo III, Call of Duty: Black Ops II, Revelation Online 2015 by Chinese game giant Netease, and Journey, which was nominated for a Grammy Award for Best Score Soundtrack for Visual Media. Guo can also be heard on the soundtracks of Inception, Hancock, Battle: Los Angeles, The Hangover Part II, Predators, Fast Five, Arthur, No Strings Attached, Beginners, Public Enemies, Rango, The Rite, X-Men: First Class, Your Highness, Yogi Bear, The Mentalist, Family Guy, American Dad!, The Cleveland Show, King of the Hill, Dunkirk, Pirates of the Caribbean: Dead Men Tell No Tales, commercials for the iPhone, Under Armour, and many others. Guo also contributed Electric Cello to the creation of elements that were used by Sound Designer Scott Martin Gershin in the creation of the Kaijus in Pacific Rim.  Her arrangement and performance of "The Flight of the Bumble-Bee" was featured in the end credits for The Heartbreak Kid and she was an additional composer on the feature film Persecuted. The Tina Guo Sample Library by Cinesamples is one of the most popular cello solo libraries available on the market today, used by composers and producers in countless media music projects.

Guo is featured on the cello in an instrumental set piece for the 100th episode of My Little Pony: Friendship Is Magic.

Guo has recorded on hundreds of albums, with artists such as John Legend, Ciara, David Archuleta, and Big K.R.I.T. She was featured on Al B. Sure!'s new single, "I Love It," from his upcoming album Honey I'm Home and was also featured on Two Steps From Hell's album SkyWorld.

Inner Passion, her 2016 collaboration with pianist Peter Kater for Hearts of Space Records, debuted at number four on the Billboard New Age Albums chart.

She is also notable as the soloist on electric cello creating the theme for Wonder Woman in the 2016 film Batman v. Superman: Dawn of Justice with Hans Zimmer, which she reprised in the Wonder Woman standalone film with Rupert Gregson-Williams as well as its 2020 sequel, Wonder Woman 1984, with Zimmer once again. In October 2018, she featured on the Jennifer Thomas album 'The Fire Within'. In 2021, she recorded together with Swedish metal band Sabaton on the song and music video "Steel Commanders". On 6 November 2022, it was announced that she will be a featured guest on Kamelot's upcoming thirteenth studio album which is set for release in early 2023.

Instruments
Guo performs on an 1878 Gand & Bernardel.  On electric cello, she plays the Custom Tina Guo Model Yamaha SVC-200; she is endorsed by Yamaha and played their instrument at the NAMM Show 2009.

Personal life
Guo's first published work as an author is "Event Horizons of Yin and Yang", a collection of philosophical prose and poetry.

Tina was married to Ray Armando Morabito, an electronic music producer.

Discography

 Autumn Winds (2011)
 The Journey (2011)
 Eternity (2013)
 Ray of Light (2014)
 A Cello Christmas (2014)
 Cello Metal (2015)
 Inner Passion (2016) (with Peter Kater)
 Game On! (2017)
 Dies Irae (2021)

Cello contributions

References

External links
 
 

1985 births
21st-century American women musicians
American cellists
American musicians of Chinese descent
Chinese cellists
Chinese emigrants to the United States
Erhu players
Living people
Musicians from Shanghai
Musicians from San Diego
People from Poway, California
USC Thornton School of Music alumni
Women cellists
21st-century cellists